New Germantown is an unincorporated community in Toboyne Township, Perry County, Pennsylvania, United States. 

The center of New Germantown is at the intersection of Germantown Road and Big Spring Road.  Its ZIP code is 17006.

References

Unincorporated communities in Pennsylvania
Unincorporated communities in Perry County, Pennsylvania